South Park 10: The Game is a mobile game based on the animated television series South Park. The game was developed by Mr.Goodliving, published by RealNetworks and was released on 28 March 2007.  The game is a standard platform game with abilities to pick up objects and use them to reach heights. Most of the moves are exclusive to each playable character in the game. The game was released after the television conclusion of South Park season 10 in late 2006.

Gameplay
South Park 10: The Game features ten stages, each stage based upon one episode from each season (one up to ten), each stage is made up of three levels and one bonus level unlocked by collecting a certain amount of Cheesy Poofs.

References

2007 video games
Mobile games
Mr.Goodliving games
Platform games
Single-player video games
Video games based on South Park
Video games developed in Finland
Video games set in Colorado